The Karate Kid is a video game published by LJN and developed by the Japanese company Atlus Co., Ltd for the NES. The gameplay loosely follows plot elements from the first and second Karate Kid films.

Gameplay
There are four levels in the game, and they play out as the movie goes. The object of each level is to defeat a variety of enemies ranging from Karate students to thugs.

Level 1
The game begins with Daniel LaRusso fighting in the All Valley Karate Tournament (the location for the first Karate Kid film's climax). He will have to go through four fighters in order to advance to the next stage. The opponent's energy bar increases as the player progresses through them. The final fight is presumably with Johnny Lawrence from the film.

Level 2
Daniel then starts the second level which is set in Okinawa (the primary setting for The Karate Kid Part II). There, he must dispatch random thugs who die in one hit while progressing to Chozen at the end of the stage. For every few enemies dispatched, Daniel can collect large "C" and "D" symbols that allow him to use Crane Kicks and Drum Punches, respectively.  They also replenish a low amount of Daniel's energy meter. There are also a few obvious and not-so-obvious entrances where Daniel can earn Drum Punches and Crane Kicks by either breaking ice-blocks, catching flies with chopsticks, or dodging a swinging hammer.

Level 3
In the third stage of play, Daniel is in a stage that is nearly identical to the second (with some tricky jumps) during a typhoon. The typhoon causes a strong wind to interfere with the player's jumps and various objects (sticks, birds) to fly through the air and threaten the player's energy. They can be hit for extra points, however. The boss is Chozen Toguchi again and this time, there is a girl up on a pole that Daniel must save. It is not necessary to beat Chozen, only rescue the girl.

Level 4
The final stage is the festival after the typhoon. Daniel wears a new outfit for this stage and the random enemies are now tougher, requiring two hits to be felled. There are also enemies with spears who take even more hits to defeat. The final boss, once again Chozen, has a new twist. Now he has Kumiko down on the ground beside him and if Daniel does not occasionally come into contact with her, she will slip off the platform and drown. This will result in a lost life. If Daniel can successfully defeat the boss without Kumiko drowning the player will be treated to a brief ending. An image of Mr. Miyagi's head appears and is animated to look as if he's talking and saying: "You have successfully guided Daniel-san through all the challenges and have become a martial arts master!". Upon saying this, Miyagi then winks to the player.

References

1987 video games
Beat 'em ups
Karate video games
LJN games
Nintendo Entertainment System games
Nintendo Entertainment System-only games
North America-exclusive video games
Platform games
Side-scrolling video games
Video game
Video games based on films
Video games set in Japan
Multiplayer and single-player video games
Atlus games
Video games developed in Japan
Video games scored by Hirohiko Takayama
Video games scored by Tsukasa Masuko